Robins Branch is a  long 2nd order tributary to the Banister River in Pittsylvania County, Virginia.  This is the only stream of this name in the United States.

Course 
Robins Branch rises about 1 mile south of Rondo, Virginia and then flows generally south to join the Banister River about 0.5 miles northeast of Banister.

Watershed 
Robins Branch drains  of area, receives about 46.0 in/year of precipitation, has a wetness index of 361.47, and is about 31% forested.

See also 
 List of Virginia Rivers

References 

Rivers of Virginia
Rivers of Pittsylvania County, Virginia
Tributaries of the Roanoke River